Ernest Thomas Bell (31 March 1880 – 2 May 1930) was a pastoralist and member of the Queensland Legislative Assembly.

Biography
Bell was born in Camboon, Queensland, to parents John Thomas Marsh Bell and his wife Gertrude Augusta (née Norton) and attended Toowoomba Grammar School and Ipswich Grammar School. When he left school he was the manager of Combargno Station, Roma.

He was involved in many agricultural associations over the years including president of the Fassifern Agricultural and Pastoral Association and chairman of the Australian Meat Council.

On 17 August 1910, Bell married Pauline Eva Taylor (died 1970) in Brisbane and together had one son and three daughters. He died in office in May 1930 and his funeral proceeded from St John's Church of England Cathedral to the Toowong Cemetery.

Political career
Bell represented the state seat of Fassifern from 1913 until his death in 1930. In that time he represented several parties that were opposed to the Labor Party.

References

Members of the Queensland Legislative Assembly
1880 births
1930 deaths
20th-century Australian politicians
National Party (Queensland, 1917) members of the Parliament of Queensland